The Berengarians were a religious sect who adhered to the views of Berengar of Tours, Archdeacon of Angers, and opposed the developing doctrine of transubstantiation in the mid-eleventh century. The Berengarian sect, considered heretical by the Roman Catholic Church, is said to have numbered 800,000 according to the historian Belamine.

Classification as heresy
The Roman Catholic Church held considerable power in Western Europe during the High and Late Middle Ages. Those clergy and theologians whom it judged guilty of heresy could be excommunicated and exiled or sentenced to death unless they formally recanted their errors. A text misattributed to John Scotus Eriugena, a philosopher-theologian and intellectual heir of Maximus the Confessor in the 9th-Century, had maintained that there was no physical transformation of the Eucharist. Later in 1047, Berengar of Tours reignited the debate in the name of Erigena.       
During the next 30 years, Berengar was asked to recant his heresy concerning what would be declared the Roman Catholic dogma of transubstantiation no less than five times including a short spell in prison.  He later retired into solitude and made no further pronouncements on the matter.

Followers of the sect
It is known that an early supporter of Berengar was Bishop Eusebius of Angers, although he later renounced the heresy.  Although it is known that Geoffrey II, Count of Anjou secured Berengar's release from prison, it is unlikely that it was more than political point scoring. The historian Belamine said that the supporters numbered 800,000 by 1160.

His followers were divided on the head of the Eucharist; though they all agreed that the bread and wine were not essentially changed, some allowed it to be changed in effect, though under an impanation, which was the opinion of Berenger himself. Others denied any change at all, and resolved all into figure. Yet others allowed a change in part, and others an entire change, with the restriction that to those who presented themselves unworthily, it was changed back again.

Influence on the reformers
As Berengar left no written tracts it is moot what influence the Berengarians had on the Protestant Reformation. While John Calvin rejected the theory of transubstantiation in favor of "pneumatic presence," earlier Martin Luther criticized the making of this teaching into a dogma as well as some of its metaphysical underpinnings and implications.

References

Former Christian denominations